Gary Michael Dubin (May 5, 1959 – October 8, 2016) was an American actor. He was best known for his portrayal of Punky Lazaar, a friend of Danny Partridge on The Partridge Family. He also voiced Toulouse in The Aristocats in 1970 and played the part of ill-fated teenager Eddie Marchand, who was eaten by the shark in Jaws 2.

Dubin portrayed a runaway boy on Green Acres in 1968. In 1969, he portrayed deaf boy Dal in the season 1 episode 25 of Land of the Giants titled, "Shell Game".  He appeared in the James Bond film Diamonds Are Forever in the carnival scene, where he lost to Jill St. John at the water balloons, complaining that he had been cheated and that she needed more wins to get the stuffed animal that, unknowing, contained the diamonds. Dubin was also a prominent voice actor in dubbing for Japanese animation throughout the 1990s to the early 2000s.

He has also acted in many other projects, his most recent being RockBarnes: The Emperor in You. Dubin died on October 8, 2016, from bone cancer, a sibling of his revealed.

Filmography

See also

Dubbing (filmmaking)#United States and English-speaking Canada
Voice acting in Japan

References

External links

1959 births
2016 deaths
20th-century American male actors
21st-century American male actors
American male child actors
American male film actors
American male television actors
American male voice actors
Deaths from bone cancer
Deaths from cancer in California
Male actors from Los Angeles